Heinz Rosner (born 14 January 1939) is a former Grand Prix motorcycle road racer from the former East Germany.

He had his best year in 1968 when he rode for the MZ factory racing team to finish the 250cc season in third place behind Yamaha teammates Phil Read and Bill Ivy. That same year, he claimed fourth place in the 350cc world championship. Rosner rode for the MZ factory for his entire career. He also sets the records for the most podiums in Gran Prix motorcycle racing history (26) without ever winning a race. He has continued to race the MZ as recently as 2010, gaining podiums at Classic meetings such as Schleiz in Germany and this despite suffering some severe injuries in a crash at the Hockenheimring in 2005.

References

1939 births
Living people
German motorcycle racers
125cc World Championship riders
250cc World Championship riders
350cc World Championship riders
Isle of Man TT riders